{{DISPLAYTITLE:C845H1343N223O243S9}}
The molecular formula C845H1343N223O243S9 (molar mass: 18802.638 g/mol) may refer to:

 Filgrastim
 Pegfilgrastim